Cain vs. Cain (Italian: Caino e Caino) is a 1993 Italian comedy film directed by Alessandro Benvenuti.

Cast
Enrico Montesano as Fabio Casamei
Alessandro Benvenuti as Franco Casamei
Daniela Poggi as Viviana
Cristiana Casini as Giada
Alessio De Lelli as Daniele
Bruno Vetti as Attilio
Gisella Sofio as Giuliana
Novello Novelli as Aureliano Casamei
Wanda Pasquini as Adelina
Ines Nobili as Irene
Emy Kay as Katerina
Evelina Gori as Luisa
Anna Maria Torniai as Adua
Giuliano Ghiselli as Adelmo
Sandro Ghiani as the Brigadier

References

External links

Cain vs. Cain at Variety Distribution

1993 films
1990s Italian-language films
1993 comedy films
Italian comedy films
Films directed by Alessandro Benvenuti
1990s Italian films